John L. Pardee was an American Negro league catcher in the 1920s.

Pardee attended Wiley College and played for the Birmingham Black Barons in 1925. In 12 recorded games, he posted seven hits and four RBI in 45 plate appearances.

References

External links
 and Baseball-Reference Black Baseball Stats and Seamheads

Year of birth missing
Year of death missing
Place of birth missing
Place of death missing
Birmingham Black Barons players
Baseball catchers